The 1977 Dartmouth Big Green football team was an American football team that represented Dartmouth College during the 1977 NCAA Division I football season. Dartmouth tied for third place in the Ivy League.

In their seventh and final season under head coach Jake Crouthamel, the Big Green compiled a 6–3 record and outscored opponents 141 to 92. Curtis Oberg and James Vailas were the team captains.

The Big Green's 4–3 conference record earned a three-way tie for third in the Ivy League. Dartmouth outscored Ivy opponents 86 to 82.

Dartmouth played its home games at Memorial Field on the college campus in Hanover, New Hampshire.

Schedule

References

Dartmouth
Dartmouth Big Green football seasons
Dartmouth Big Green football